11133 Kumotori, provisional designation , is a background asteroid from the central regions of the asteroid belt, approximately  in diameter. It was discovered on 2 December 1996, by Japanese amateur astronomer Takao Kobayashi at his Ōizumi Observatory. The asteroid was named after Mount Kumotori near Tokyo. It has a rotation period of 4.6 hours.

Orbit and classification 

Kumotori is a non-family asteroid from the main belt's background population. It orbits the Sun in the central main-belt at a distance of 2.6–2.9 AU once every 4 years and 8 months (1,690 days; semi-major axis of 2.786 AU). Its orbit has an eccentricity of 0.06 and an inclination of 11° with respect to the ecliptic. The asteroid was first observed at Palomar Observatory in March 1989. The body's observation arc begins with its official discovery observation at Oizumi.

Physical characteristics 

Kumotori has been characterized as a rare L-type asteroid by Pan-STARRS survey. It is also assumed to be a carbonaceous C-type asteroid.

Rotation period 

In April 2012, a rotational lightcurve of Kumotori was obtained from photometric observations in the R-band by astronomers at the Palomar Transient Factory in California. Lightcurve analysis gave a rotation period of 4.634 hours with a brightness amplitude of 0.33 magnitude.

Diameter and albedo 

The Collaborative Asteroid Lightcurve Link assumes an albedo for a carbonaceous asteroid of 0.057 and calculates a diameter of 8.96 kilometers based on an absolute magnitude of 13.97.

Naming 

This minor planet was named after Mount Kumotori (雲取山 Kumotori-san). The official naming citation was published by the Minor Planet Center on 9 November 2003.

References

External links 
 Asteroid Lightcurve Database (LCDB), query form (info )
 Dictionary of Minor Planet Names, Google books
 Discovery Circumstances: Numbered Minor Planets (10001)-(15000) – Minor Planet Center
 

011133
Discoveries by Takao Kobayashi
Named minor planets
19961202